Heidi Yuen Hoi Dik (born 22 August 1992) is a Hongkonger footballer who plays as a forward for Hong Kong Women League club Citizen AA. She is also a futsal player, and represented Hong Kong internationally in both football and futsal.

International career
Yuen has been capped for Hong Kong at senior level in both football and futsal. In football, she represented Hong Kong at three AFC Women's Olympic Qualifying Tournament editions (2012, 2016 and 2020), two AFC Women's Asian Cup qualification editions (2014 and 2018), two EAFF E-1 Football Championship editions (2017 and 2019) and the 2018 Asian Games.

In futsal, Yuen played for Hong Kong at two AFC Women's Futsal Championship editions (2015 and 2018).

International goals

See also
List of Hong Kong women's international footballers

References

1992 births
Living people
Hong Kong women's footballers
Women's association football forwards
Hong Kong women's international footballers